KHHB-LP (channel 5), branded on-air as Hilo Five, was a low-power independent television station in Hilo, Hawaii, United States, owned by Hilo Hawaii Broadcasting. Its transmitter was located near Pepeekeo, Hawaii.

On cable, the station was only available on the eastern half of the Big Island of Hawaii on Oceanic Cable channel 46 (analog cable) and 49 (digital cable). As of November 2007, KHHB-LP was the only low-power TV station in Hawaii to be carried on Oceanic Cable.

KHHB-LP first hit the airwaves in December 2005 under the call letters K05LD. The station took on its current calls in 2006.

The majority of KHHB's schedule was composed of short films and religious music videos. The station also carried syndicated reruns of the classic shows Northern Exposure, The Nanny, Mad About You, Charlie's Angels, Starsky and Hutch, Mission: Impossible and Soap during the late afternoons and prime time. In late December, reruns of Law & Order: Criminal Intent were phased into the schedule.

The station also offered five-minute long newscasts every night at 7, 9 and 11 p.m. local time that catered specifically to Hilo viewers. These newscasts were also available for streaming on the station's website.

In January 2007, the Honolulu Star-Bulletin reported that a sister station for the western half of the island was also in the works, but as of March 2008 it has yet to surface.

The last broadcast was on May 6, 2011, and the license was cancelled on July 25, 2012, for failure to transmit a signal for a 12-month period.

References

HHB-LP
Defunct television stations in the United States
Television channels and stations disestablished in 2012
Television channels and stations established in 2006
2006 establishments in Hawaii
2012 disestablishments in Hawaii
HHB-LP